The Willcock Ministry was the 19th Ministry of the Government of Western Australia, and was led by Labor Premier John Willcock. It succeeded the Second Collier Ministry on 27 August 1936, upon the resignation of Philip Collier as Premier on ill health grounds. It became the longest-serving Labor ministry in Western Australia.

The ministry was followed by the Wise Ministry on 3 August 1945, four days after Willcock resigned as Premier and handed over to the Deputy Premier, Frank Wise.

First Ministry
The following ministers served until the reconstitution of the Ministry on 21 April 1939, following the 1939 state election. Selby Munsie, in parliament since 1911, died on 12 March 1938, creating a vacancy for Alexander Panton to be brought into the ministry. At the end of the term, Frank Troy, who had spent 35 years in Parliament as the member for Mount Magnet, was appointed Agent-General for Western Australia in London. He resigned from the Ministry on 3 March 1939, but the Ministry was not reshuffled due to the impending election on 18 March, and Frank Wise adopted Troy's roles in an acting capacity.

Second Ministry
On 18 April 1939, the Lieutenant-Governor, Sir James Mitchell, designated 8 principal executive offices of the Government under section 43(2) of the Constitution Acts Amendment Act 1899 and appointed the ministers to the positions. They then served until the reconstitution of the Ministry on 9 December 1943, following the 1943 state election.

Third Ministry

On 9 December 1943, the Lieutenant-Governor, Sir James Mitchell, designated 8 principal executive offices of the Government under section 43(2) of the Constitution Acts Amendment Act 1899 and appointed the ministers to the positions. They then served until the end of the Ministry on 3 August 1945, following the resignation of John Willcock.

References

 Hansard Indexes for 1936-1945, "Legislature of Western Australia"
  Also 1938:462 (24 March 1938)

Western Australian ministries
Australian Labor Party ministries in Western Australia
Ministries of George VI
Ministries of Edward VIII